The 2015 US Open 9-Ball Championship 2015 was the 40th U.S. Open 9-ball Championship event in the discipline of 9-Ball.  The event was played between 25–30 October 2015 in the Marriott Chesapeake in  Chesapeake,  Virginia, USA. Kevin Cheng won the event, winning the final 13–6 against Englishman Karl Boyes and became the third Asian player after Efren Reyes (1994) and Alex Pagulayan (2005) to win the US Open.

The previous year's winner Shane van Boening finished in 25th place.

Tournament format
The tournament was played as a Double-elimination tournament. The event was played as winner break, and as a race to 11 for the double elimination event, and race to 13 for the final.

Ranking 
The following were the 32 best placed players.

References

External links
 Official Website
 US Open 9-Ball Championships 2015  at azbilliards.com
 US Open 9-Ball Championships 2015 at sixpockets.de

U.S. Open
U.S. Open
U.S Open 9-Ball championship